Bepi may refer to:

× Brassoepidendrum, an orchid hybrid genus abbreviated Bepi.
Giuseppe "Bepi" Colombo (1920–1984), Italian scientist
Bepi, Zahedan, a village in Iran
Bepi Pezzulli, Italian-British business lawyer